Carlos Méndez Martínez (born June 26, 1943) is a Puerto Rican politician and former mayor of Aguadilla, Puerto Rico for 24 years.

Early life and education

Carlos Méndez-Martínez was born in Aguadilla, Puerto Rico to Pablo Méndez-Ellinger, a tobacconist from Aguadilla, Puerto Rico and Rosa Martínez-Rosa, a housewife from Rincón, Puerto Rico. His dad died when Méndez was one year old and his mother died when he was 9 years old. Without having graduated from high school, at age 17, he joined the United States Army, becoming a veteran at the age of 19. He studied silversmithing and gemology and worked in both. He also worked in the real estate business. At the age of 45, Méndez took the GED and studied an Associate of Arts in Political Science at a community college and  continued to study a Bachelor of Arts in Political Science at the University of Washington, graduating in 1992. Méndez, wrote a book titled Tuve que contar mi historia which was published  in 2009 by Editorial Tiempo Nuevo.

Political career

In 1995, he returned to Puerto Rico, and ran for mayor of Aguadilla at the 1996 general elections. He has been reelected in 2000, 2004, 2008, 2012 and 2016. In the 2008 elections, he received almost 70% of the votes. His margin of victory was one of the largest among elected mayors in that election. He was the president of the Republican Party of Puerto Rico from 2007 to 2015 and president of the Puerto Rico Mayors Federation. In 2012, Méndez endorsed the nomination of Mitt Romney for president of the United States in the 2012 Republican National Convention. After 24 years as mayor, Méndez announced he would not seek re-election in 2020.

Among his notable works as mayor is the Aguadilla Ice Skating Arena, Ramey Base Bowling Alley, Aguadilla Electronic Library, Atlantic Garden Veterans Cemetery, Paseo Real Marina, Las Cascadas Hotel,  Aguadilla City Center,  Skate and Splash Park, and Tres Palmas Park.

While the "Las Cascadas Hotel" was constructed the hotel was not completed under the mayor's tenure and in 2019 reports indicated the mayor placed the property along with the Aguadilla Ice Skating Arena for sale. 

In 2019, Aguadilla received the City Livability Award from the United States Conference of Mayors and honored the efforts spearheaded by Carlos Méndez Martínez.

Personal life

He married on January 1, 1977, with Heidi G. Méndez (née Mayer) at Seattle in King County, Washington. They had a son, Mark A. Méndez. Méndez divorced in 1998, after 21 years of marriage. In 1999, he met his current wife Mildred Cortes-Ramos.

References

|-

1943 births
Living people
Mayors of places in Puerto Rico
New Progressive Party (Puerto Rico) politicians
People from Aguadilla, Puerto Rico
Republican Party (Puerto Rico) politicians
United States Army soldiers
University of Washington College of Arts and Sciences alumni